Ruslan Mikhailovich Alborov (born 13 February 1983) is a Russian professional football coach and a former player. He is an assistant coach with FC Alania Vladikavkaz.

External links
 
 

1983 births
Living people
Russian footballers
FC Spartak Vladikavkaz players
Russian Premier League players
FC Sakhalin Yuzhno-Sakhalinsk players
Association football forwards
FC Nizhny Novgorod (2007) players